The 2012 FIM Moto2 World Championship was a part of the 64th F.I.M. Road Racing World Championship season. Stefan Bradl was the reigning champion, but did not contest in season as he joined the MotoGP with LCR Honda.

Season summary
Marc Márquez won the Moto2 championship title after a season-long battle with fellow Spanish rider Pol Espargaró; a third-place finish for Márquez at the Australian Grand Prix – despite a win for Espargaró – was enough to give him his second world title before moving into the premier class for the  season. He took his last victory in the class at the Valencian Grand Prix, the last event of the season, despite starting from 33rd on the grid. This performance, which included overtaking 20 bikes on the first lap alone, meant the biggest comeback in the sport's history. Márquez's result was enough to give Suter the constructors' title for the class.

Calendar
The following Grands Prix were scheduled to take place in 2012:

The Fédération Internationale de Motocyclisme released an 17-race provisional calendar on 14 September 2011. Another provisional calendar was released three months later, with the Qatar Grand Prix moved forward by a week.

 ‡ = Night race
 †† = Saturday race

Calendar changes
 The Czech Republic and Indianapolis Grand Prix swapped places.

Teams and riders
 A provisional entry list was released by the Fédération Internationale de Motocyclisme on 13 January 2012. All Moto2 competitors raced with an identical CBR600RR inline-four engine developed by Honda. Teams competed with tyres supplied by Dunlop.

Notes:
 — Eric Granado only completed from the British Grand Prix onwards, after he reaches the age of 16 which is the minimum age to compete in the championship.

Results and standings

Grands Prix

Riders' standings
Scoring system
Points were awarded to the top fifteen finishers. A rider had to finish the race to earn points.

Constructors' standings
Points were awarded to the top fifteen finishers. A rider had to finish the race to earn points.

 Each constructor got the same number of points as their best placed rider in each race.

References

2012 in Grand Prix motorcycle racing
2012 in motorcycle sport
Grand Prix motorcycle racing seasons